Alpha Pierce Jamison (November 27, 1875 – April 12, 1962) was an American football player and coach of football and basketball. He served as the head football coach at Purdue University from 1898 to 1900, compiling a record of 11–11–1. Jamison was also the head basketball coach at Purdue for two seasons from 1899 to 1901, tallying a mark of 12–1.

Head coaching record

Football

References

External links
 

1875 births
1962 deaths
19th-century players of American football
American football fullbacks
American football halfbacks
American football quarterbacks
Basketball coaches from Indiana
Purdue Boilermakers football coaches
Purdue Boilermakers football players
Purdue Boilermakers men's basketball coaches
Sportspeople from Lafayette, Indiana
Players of American football from Indiana